Dutugamunu, also known as Dutthagamani Abhaya ("fearless Gamini"), was a king of the Anuradhapura Kingdom who reigned from 161 BC to 137 BC. He is renowned for reuniting the whole island of Sri Lanka by defeating and overthrowing Elara, the usurping Tamil prince from the Chola Kingdom, who had invaded the Anuradhapura kingdom in 205 BC. Dutugamunu also expanded and beautified the city of Anuradhapura and projected the power of his native Rajarata region across the island of Sri Lanka.

Due to his significance as one of the most potent symbols of Sinhalese historical power, Dutugamunu's story is swathed in myth and legend. However, many aspects of the accounts of his life have been verified by contemporary inscriptions, and the basic account of his life is generally accepted as accurate.

Etymology 

Dutugamunu is also known as Dutthagamani Abhaya ("fearless Gamini"). The Mahavamsa describes how as a youth he mocked his father Kavantissa, king of Ruhuna, for refusing to wage war against the powerful  King Elara who ruled Sri Lanka for 45 years and known and venerated by  the  Sinhalese as a Just King or Dharmista Elara* , He ruled what was then known as the island of Ratnadiva from Anuradhapura.  Duttagamni  , the prefix Dutta means terror-inspiring, rustic or  rowdy2*  stated that "If [his] father were a man he would not speak thus" and sent him a piece of women's jewellery. The resulting fury of the king caused many of his friends to flee to Malaya region and the prince himself being dubbed Dutthagamani,  meaning "disobedient". After his death, he was referred to as Dharma Gamini ("righteous Gamini"), but it is as Duttha Gamini or Dutugemunu that he is known to posterity.

Ancestry and family 
The Mahavamsa constitutes the major source on Dutugemunu's reign and dedicates some six chapters (out of 35) to his tale. In chapter 22 he is described as being descended from the ancient royal family of Rajarata through Devanampiyatissa's brother Mahanaga. At the time of his birth Dutugemunu's father was Kavantissa, king of Ruhuna, a small kingdom in south-east Sri Lanka outside of the influence of Rajarata in the north; the border between the two polities was the Mahaganga, or 'Great River', possibly the modern Menik Ganga. Kavantissa is portrayed in the Mahamvamsa as 'devoutly believing in the three gems, [and] he provided the brotherhood continually with...needful things'.

Dutugemunu's mother was Viharamahadevi, daughter of Tissa, king of Kalyani. Legend has it that as punishment for Tissa slaying a Buddhist monk, Kalyani had been subject to a series of deluges from the sea. To placate it Tissa placed his daughter Devi in a golden boat with the words 'A King's Daughter' written on the side, and set her out to sea. Miraculously the princess washed ashore, alive and well, in Ruhuna, and married Kavantissa.

During her pregnancy with Dutugemunu, Viharamahadevi had a series of peculiar cravings, including the urge to sleep on a pillow made of honeycombs. In particular her urge to drink the water used to wash a sword that had cleaved the head of a warrior of Elara, whilst standing on that same head, raised the interest of the soothsayers at court, who predicted that 'The queen's son, when he has vanquished the Damilas (Tamil) and built up a united kingdom, will make the doctrine to shine forth brightly'. Viharamahadevi gave birth to a son named Gamani Abhaya some time later, and after that to another child, a boy named Tissa.

Around the time of Gamani's birth, 'an elephant of the six-tusked race brought his young one thither and left him here and went his way'. Named Kandula, he went on to become Gamani's mount and accompanied him through much of the prince's adventures.

Dutugemunu's sister

"Recent archaeological studies have found evidence proving that King Kavantissa had a daughter who was a sister to King Dutu Gemunu".
New evidence to this appeared in The Island of March 27, 2017.

The battle in the palace and early reign 

By the age of sixteen Gamani was 'vigorous, renowned, intelligent and a hero in majesty and might', if a little wayward. Determined to expel the invading king of Rajarata, Gamani levied an army from around Rohana and declared his intention to regain the north to his father. The king forbade this stating that 'the land on this side of the river is enough'; the resulting exchange between father and son saw Gamani being dubbed 'Duttha Gamani', his friends fleeing to Malaya, and he himself being incarcerated in a royal prison.

Kavantissa is known as a brilliant strategist who recognized early that he needed to make his kingdom powerful before waging a war against the invaders. He assembled armies and made his kingdom prosperous in "rice and betel leaf" - this meaning that the people had a lot of agricultural surplus. The legendary ten "great giants" - men who had great strength – are brought into the army at this time. Kavantissa repeatedly makes Dutugemunu and Tissa swear that they would never fight one another and that they would always respect and listen to the advice of the priests. He also makes the ten giants swear never to pick sides in a war between the brothers.

Upon Kavantissa's death, Dutugemunu found himself having to defend his crown against his younger brother Tissa, who had seized possession of not only the elephant Kandula, but the dowager queen Viharamahadevi as well. The war between the two began with a defeat for Dutugemunu at Culanganiyapitthi, where 'many thousands of the king's (Dutugemunu's) men' perished. Dutugemunu was forced to flee back to Mahagama where he levied another army and engaged Tissa in yet another battle in the vicinity of the city. Legend has it that as Tissa, fought his brother riding the royal elephant "Kandula" against Dutugemunu who rode a mare. Dutugemunu at one point made the mare jump over the elephant causing the elephant to recognize its master and attempt to kill Tissa who hastily dismounts via a tree. Dutugemunu was victorious and Tissa was smuggled off the battlefield disguised as the corpse of a monk. It is said that Dutugemunu recognized the ploy and called out to his brother "Are you not ashamed to be carried on the back of these priests?" Some time afterwards, however, Dutugemunu and Tissa were reconciled through the efforts of Viharamahadevi and the monks, and Tissa became one of the king's foremost generals.

Regaining of Rajarata 
Having secured his throne, he then planned his operations to regain the north, which included not only Rajarata but numerous smaller semi-independent polities. The king's army consisted of 'chariots, troops and beasts for riders', soldiers and a number of war elephants, as well as a number of monks (to advise the King) and a relic placed in his spear for luck and blessings. In addition he was accompanied by the famed Ten Giant Warriors who had been recruited from all over the island by his father Kavantissa – Nandhimitra, Suranimala, Mahasona, Theraputtabhya, Gotaimbara, Bharana, Vasabha, Khanjadeva, Velusamanna, and Phussadeva.

The campaign saw Dutugemunu subduing a number of usurping Tamil rulers in the north (as many as 32, according to the Mahavamsa). Of particular interest is the four-month siege of Vijitanagara, where the defending Tamil troops are said to have used 'red-hot iron and molten pitch' to panic Dutugemunu's elephants. During this time he also married Ran Etana, the daughter of a chieftain who continued to pay homage to Elara of Anuradhapura. On at least two occasions victory is attributed to the king's 'cunning' and the bravery of Kandhula. The campaign reached a climax at the eastern gate of Anuradhapura, where Dutugemunu, riding Kandhula, finally confronted the aged usurped king Elara, on his own elephant Mahäpabbata, and slew him with a spear; the encounter is one of the most famous in Sri Lankan history.

Dutugemunu's victory at Anuradhapura put him in the unprecedented position of ruling nearly the entire island of (Sri) Lanka. Despite this however his position was far from problem-free. Elara, despite being an invading Tamil from the Chola empire of south India, was renowned as having been a just and righteous leader, and Dutugemunu went out of his way to ensure the memory of the old king was revered as he cremated Elara and built a tomb for his ashes and made rules for travelers to get off and pay their respects to his tomb. Furthermore, 'looking back upon his glorious victory, great though it was, [he] knew no joy, remembering that thereby was wrought the destruction of thousands of both enemies and his soldiers.' This is attested to by the sheer number of religious foundations attributed to him by the chronicles (between 68 and 99), which include magnificent stupas, monasteries, and shrines.

Reign and construction work 

Aside from his many construction projects Dutugemunu's reign is memorable for his estrangement from his son, Saliya or Salirajakumara. The Prince fell in love with a girl called Agokamaladevi or Asokamala; unfortunately for all concerned she was of the Scavenger caste, one of the lowest castes in Sinhalese society. Saliya refused to give her up and rejected the throne. Though the Mahavamsa mentions no reconciliation, folk stories have the young couple eventually restored to the king's good graces.

The king's reign also saw extensive contact between Sri Lanka and traders from the west, including Arabs, Persians, and possibly Romans

Following his consolidation of his position Dutugemunu began a series of huge construction projects, many of which still survive in Anuradhapura today. As with nearly everything in Dutugemunu's life, each foundation comes with its own legend, many of which reveal the preoccupations and inclinations of ancient Sinhalese society.

The first foundation mentioned in the Mahavamsa is the Maricavatti vihara, the modern Mirisavetiya. Legend has it that traveling to the shore of the Tank of Tissa with the 'women of the harem' for a water-festival, Dutugemunu planted his spear (which contained a sacred relic) in the soft ground. When preparing to return to the palace, he found that neither he, nor anyone in his retinue, could pull it out. Taking this as a sign he ordered the construction of a stupa over the spear.

Dutugemunu also ordered the construction of the Lohapasada, or Brazen Palace, a nine-story chapter house for monks, which derived its name from its bright copper-tiled roof. Again, legend has it that the design for the palace was based on a building seen in one of the heavens by a group of monks, who drew the design with 'red arsenic on linen' and dispatched it to the king.

Perhaps his most famous creation was the Ruwanweliseya, also known as the Great Stupa or and Swarnamalee Chetiya, to house the begging bowl of the Buddha. The construction was started on the full moon day of the month of Vesak (traditionally the date of the birth, enlightenment, and passing away of the Buddha) with the creation of a foundation of crushed rock. To hammer the stones into place elephants were used with their feet bound in leather. Dutugemunu is said to have overseen the work personally, being present at the construction of the relic chamber and the interring of the bowl itself. The dedication of a stupa is described in Chap. 29 of the Mahavamsa, which lists the visit of delegations from various parts of India, as well as a delegation of 30,000 monks from Alexandria of the Caucasus, led by the Indo-Greek monk Mahadharmaraksita.

Other notable works include the construction of a stupa in Mundeshiwari, current day Bihar, India.

Spiritual relationship with god "Kataragama" 

Stories relating to some of the king's constructions reflect a spiritual relationship with the Kataragama deviyo. Two such sites are Henakaduwa Purana Raja Maha Viharaya at Tangalle and Ruhunu Kataragama Maha Devalaya.

During the period of preparations for war with King Elara, the Kataragama deity appeared in front of King Dutugemunu and gave him a sword for him to use in the war at the present-day site of Henakaduwa temple (hena and Kaduna, meaning thunder and sword respectively in Sinhalese).

After defeating Elara in single combat in the Battle of Vijithapura and subsequently regaining power in the country, the Kataragama deity appeared yet again before Dutugemunu while the latter was in meditation at Kiri Vehera, Kataragama. The victorious king asked the deity what should be done in return for the deity's help in winning the battle. The god replied by shooting an arrow in the direction of Wedihiti Kanda from Kiri Vehera and instructed Dutugemunu to build a shrine where the arrow lands.

Death and succession 
King Dutugemunu did not live to see his beloved Ruwanweliseya completed, dying before the plaster work was finished. The Mahavamsa dedicates an entire chapter to his death, which contains a poignant scene where the dying king is taken by palanquin to the vicinity of the incomplete stupa. There he also encounters his old colleague Theraputtbhya, now a monk. After some discussion of the mortality of men, the aged monarch passes away and is immediately reborn in the heavenly realm of Tusita.

A common folk tale surrounding the death of King Dutugemunu is that as he was dying he was told that Ruwanweliseya was completed in order to keep him happy. The well-intentioned plan went awry, however, when Dutugemunu asked to be shown the finished building. His brother Tissa had the entire building draped in white cloth to present the illusion of whitewash, and due to his failing eyesight Dutugemunu did not spot the difference, dying convinced that the building was finished.

Following his death Dutugemunu was succeeded by his brother Saddhatissa, rather than his disinherited son Saliya.

In popular culture 
2015 film Maharaja Gemunu emphasized the life of Dutugamunu until his fight with King Elara. Uddika Premarathna stars as Dutugamunu in the film. The film was directed by Jayantha Chandrasiri.
The teledrama Gemunu Maharaja was telecasted on Hiru TV. Character was portrayed by Malinda Perera.

See also 
 Gemunu Watch
 Mahavamsa
 Ten Giant Warriors
 List of Sri Lankan monarchs
 History of Sri Lanka

References

External links 
 Mirisawetiya Stupa
The Brazen Palace
Anuradhapura 
Ancient monuments in Sri Lanka
The Mahavamsa Online

Monarchs of Anuradhapura
Sinhalese kings
 Sinhalese Buddhist monarchs
137 BC deaths
Year of birth unknown
House of Vijaya
2nd-century BC Sinhalese monarchs